Nail in the Coffin is a collaborative Halloween-themed EP by Aja and Shilow, released on September 27, 2019.

Composition and promotion
The EP "[blends] emo punk, trap, country and EDM, paying homage to classic and modern horror films".

"Mama Chola", released on August 30, served as the EP's lead single, and was accompanied by a music video filmed in Kansas City. "The Purge" served as the EP's second single.

Reception
NME Jordan Bassett described the EP as "a ghoulish anthology of heavy hitting hip-hop bangers that shout-out Jason from the Friday The 13th movies and the more recent likes of The Purge".

Jon Ali of Billboard described the "Halloween-meets-trap" EP as "menacingly delicious", and included "Haunted House" on his "Billboard Pride's October 2019 Playlist".

Track listing
 "The Purge" — Aja & Shilow
 "Lost" (feat. Josh Hurst of Young Medicine) — Aja & Shilow
 "Mama Chola" (feat. Amira Wang) — Aja & Shilow
 "Body Count" — Shilow
 "Haunted House" — Aja & Shilow
 "Paranoia" — Aja
 "Eulogy (Nail in the Coffin)" — Aja & Shilow

Track listing adapted from the iTunes Store

References

External links
 

2019 EPs
Aja (entertainer) albums
Collaborative albums
Halloween albums